Income Protection Insurance (IPI) is an insurance policy, available principally in Australia, Ireland, New Zealand, South Africa, and the United Kingdom, paying benefits to policyholders who are incapacitated and hence unable to work due to illness or accident. IPI policies were formerly called Permanent Health Insurance (PHI). The same concept is instantiated in the United States as disability income insurance (disability insurance). 

A study by British insurer Legal & General, entitled Deadline to the Breadline Report 2014, found that only 8% of UK households have income protection insurance. Further work to bring the topic into the public domain appears in the 7 Families project.

References

Personal finance
Types of insurance
Income